Heinrich Wilhelm Zimmerman, portrait painter, was born at Danzig in 1805. In 1828 he went to Vienna, and thence, in 1835, to Paris, where he placed himself under Hippolyte Delaroche. While in Paris he painted his Sabbath Morning in Styria, a large work with twenty-six figures. On his return to Danzig he practised chiefly as a portrait painter. He died at Danzig in 1841.

References

1805 births
1841 deaths
19th-century German painters
19th-century German male artists
German male painters
Artists from Gdańsk
People from West Prussia